Solidago rigida, known by the common names stiff goldenrod and stiff-leaved goldenrod, is a North American plant species in the family Asteraceae. It has a widespread distribution in Canada and the United States, where it is found primarily east of the Rocky Mountains. It is typically found in open, dry areas associated with calcareous or sandy soil. Habitats include prairies, savannas, and glades.

Description
Soliadgo rigida is a tall, leafy perennial. It produces heads of yellow flowers in the late summer and fall. Its fruit is a wind-dispersed achene.

Subspecies
Subspecies
Solidago rigida subsp. glabrata (E.L.Braun) S.B.Heard & Semple – southeastern + south-central U.S.
Solidago rigida subsp. humilis (Porter) S.B.Heard & Semple – central + western Canada, central + western United States as far west as the Rocky Mountains
Solidago rigida subsp. rigida – Ontario, central + eastern U.S.

Conservation
This species is considered by NatureServe to be globally "secure" (G5), which is the lowest level of conservation concern assigned. However, it is known to be rare on the local level, due to its declining grassland habitat. It is listed as endangered in Connecticut, New Jersey and Pennsylvania. It is listed as endangered and extirpated in Maryland, as threatened in New York, and as historical in Rhode Island.

Native American ethnobotany
The Ojibwe use a decoction of root as an enema, and take an infusion of the root to treat "stoppage of urine". The Meskwaki make the flowers into a lotion and use them  on bee stings and for swollen faces.

References

rigida
Plants described in 1753
Flora of Canada
Flora of the United States
Taxa named by Carl Linnaeus